Missing You Dearly is the debut album by indie rock band Twothirtyeight.

Track listing 
 "I'll Never Do That"
 "Things Mistaken"
 "Color Blind"
 "Number Four"
 "Kevin"
 "Stripped of All"
 "Chase What Makes Your Heart Flutter"
 "Well So Deep"
 "Subtle Sacrifice"
 "Trials"
 "My Friend Pedro"
 "Yellow Carpet"

References 

Twothirtyeight albums
1998 debut albums
Tooth & Nail Records albums